Pyrausta suavidalis is a moth in the family Crambidae. It is found in Brazil.

References

Moths described in 1899
suavidalis
Moths of South America